Llangristiolus is a village and community in the middle of Anglesey, Wales, southwest of Llangefni, and is named after Saint Cristiolus. The River Cefni flows through the village. The village is within a mile of the A5 and A55 roads. The village of Rhostrehwfa is in the community.

The church of St Cristiolus, Llangristiolus, dates from the 12th century.

Notable people
 Henry Maurice (ca.1647–1691), a Welsh clergyman
 Richard Owen, (1839–1887), a Welsh Calvinistic Methodist minister and preacher.
 Edward Greenly (1861–1951), English geologist, buried at Llangristiolus
 Medwyn Williams (born ca.1940), a Welsh vegetable gardener, 11 x gold medallist at the Chelsea Flower Show.
 Naomi Watts (born 1968), film actress, lived in Llangristiolus with her maternal grandparents at Llanfawr as a child.
 Rhun ap Iorwerth (born 1972), MS for Ynys Môn resides in the village
 Meinir Gwilym (born 1983), singer/songwriter, educated at Ysgol Henblas within the village.

References

External links 
photos of Llangristiolus and surrounding area on geograph

 
Villages in Anglesey